Aleksandr Borisovich Sudarikov (born August 23, 1969) is a retired Russian professional footballer. He made his professional debut in the Soviet Second League in 1988 for SK EShVSM Moscow.

Honours
 Russian Cup winner: 1993.

References

1969 births
Living people
Soviet footballers
Russian footballers
Association football midfielders
Russian expatriate footballers
Expatriate footballers in Bangladesh
Expatriate footballers in Belarus
Russian expatriate sportspeople in Bangladesh
Russian Premier League players
FC FShM Torpedo Moscow players
FC Tyumen players
FC Torpedo Moscow players
FC Torpedo-2 players
FC Dynamo Barnaul players
Abahani Limited (Dhaka) players
FC Dynamo Brest players